This is a list of reptiles of Western Australia:

Crocodylia (crocodiles)
Crocodylidae
 Crocodylus johnstoni (freshwater crocodile)
 Crocodylus porosus (estuarine crocodile, saltwater crocodile)

Testudines (turtles)
Chelidae
Chelodina colliei (southwestern snake-necked turtle, oblong turtle)
Chelodina oblonga (northern snake-necked turtle)
Chelodina steindachneri (dinner-plate turtle, flat-shelled turtle)
Chelodina burrungandjii
Chelodina kuchlingi
Chelodina walloyarrina
Elseya dentata (northern snapping turtle)
Emydura victoriae (red-faced turtle)
Pseudemydura umbrina (western swamp turtle)
Cheloniidae
Caretta caretta (loggerhead sea turtle)
Chelonia mydas (green sea turtle)
Eretmochelys imbricata (hawksbill sea turtle)
Lepidochelys olivacea (olive ridley sea turtle, Pacific ridley sea turtle)
Natator depressus (flatback sea turtle)
Dermochelyidae
Dermochelys coriacea (leatherback turtle, leathery turtle, lute turtle)

Squamata (lizards) 
Agamidae (dragons)
 Amphibolurus norrisi
 Caimanops amphiboluroides (mulga dragon)
 Chelosania brunnea (chameleon dragon)
 Chlamydosaurus kingii (frill-necked lizard, frilled lizard)
 Cryptagama aurita
 Ctenophorus caudicinctus (ring-tailed dragon)
 Ctenophorus clayi
 Ctenophorus cristatus (crested dragon)
 Ctenophorus femoralis
 Ctenophorus fordi (Malle dragon)
 Ctenophorus isolepis (military dragon)
 Ctenophorus maculatus (spotted dragon)
 Ctenophorus mckenziei
 Ctenophorus nuchalis (central netted dragon)
 Ctenophorus ornatus (ornate crevice-dragon)
 Ctenophorus pictus (painted dragon)
 Ctenophorus reticulatus (western netted dragon)
 Ctenophorus rufescens
 Ctenophorus salinarum
 Ctenophorus scutulatus (lozenge-marked dragon)
 Ctenophorus yinnietharra (Yinnietharra dragon)
 Diporiphora albilabris
 Diporiphora bennettii
 Diporiphora bilineata (two-lined dragon)
 Diporiphora convergens
 Diporiphora lalliae
 Diporiphora magna
 Diporiphora pindan
 Diporiphora reginae
 Diporiphora superba
 Diporiphora valens
 Diporiphora winneckei
 Lophognathus gilberti (Gilbert's dragon)
 Lophognathus longirostris (long-nosed water dragon)
 Lophognathus temporalis (northern water dragon)
 Moloch horridus (thorny dragon or thorny devil)
 Pogona microlepidota
 Pogona minor (bearded dragon)
 P. m. minor (western bearded dragon)
 P. m. minima (Abrolhos bearded dragon) 
 P. m. mitchelli
 Pogona nullarbor
 Genus Tympanocryptis
 T. adelaidensis (Queen Adelaide dragon)
 T. cephalus (blotch-tailed earless dragon)
 T. intima (gibber earless dragon)
 T. lineata (lineated earless dragon)
 T. parviceps (Gnaraloo heath dragon)
 T. uniformis (even-scaled earless dragon)

Gekkonidae (geckoes)
 Amalosia obscura
 Christinus alexanderi (marbled gecko)
 Christinus marmoratus (marbled gecko)
 Crenadactylus ocellatus (clawless gecko)
 Diplodactylus alboguttatus
 Diplodactylus assimilis
 Diplodactylus ciliaris (spiny-tailed gecko)
 Diplodactylus conspicillatus (fat-tailed gecko)
 Diplodactylus elderi (jewelled gecko)
 Diplodactylus fulleri
 Diplodactylus galeatus
 Diplodactylus granariensis
 Diplodactylus intermedius (eastern spiny-tailed gecko)
 Diplodactylus jeanae
 Diplodactylus kenneallyi
 Diplodactylus maini
 Diplodactylus mcmillani
 Diplodactylus michaelseni
 Diplodactylus mitchelli
 Diplodactylus occultus
 Diplodactylus ornatus
 Diplodactylus polyophthalmus
 Diplodactylus pulcher
 Diplodactylus rankini
 Diplodactylus savagei
 Diplodactylus squarrosus
 Diplodactylus stenodactylus (crowned gecko)
 Diplodactylus strophurus
 Diplodactylus taeniatus (white-striped gecko)
 Diplodactylus wellingtonae
 Diplodactylus wilsoni
 Diplodactylus wombeyi
 Gehyra australis (northern dtella, house gecko)
 Gehyra fenestrula (Pilbara spotted gecko)
 Gehyra montium
 Gehyra nana
 Gehyra occidentalis
 Gehyra pilbara (Pilbara dtella)
 Gehyra punctata (spotted gecko)
 Gehyra purpurascens
 Gehyra variegata (tree dtella)
 Gehyra xenopus
 Hemidactylus frenatus (Asian house gecko)

 Heteronotia binoei (Bynoe's gecko, prickly gecko)
 Heteronotia planiceps
 Heteronotia spelea (desert cave gecko)
 Lucasium damaeum (beaded gecko)
 Nephrurus asper (spiny knob-tailed gecko)
 Nephrurus laevissimus (knob-tailed gecko)
 Nephrurus levis (knob-tailed gecko)
 Nephrurus stellatus (southern knob-tailed gecko)
 Nephrurus vertebralis (knob-tailed gecko)
 Nephrurus wheeleri (knob-tailed gecko)
 Oedura filicipoda
 Oedura gracilis
 Oedura marmorata (marbled velvet gecko)
 Oedura reticulata (reticulated velvet gecko)
 Oedura rhombifer (zigzag gecko)
 Pseudothecadactylus lindneri (giant cave gecko)
 Rhynchoedura ornata (western beaked gecko)
 Underwoodisaurus milii (thick-tailed gecko)

Pygopodidae (legless lizards)
 Aprasia haroldi
 Aprasia inaurita
 Aprasia pulchella
 Aprasia repens
 Aprasia rostrata
 Aprasia smithi
 Aprasia striolata
 Delma borea
 Delma concinna
 Delma elegans
 Delma fraseri
 Delma grayii
 Delma haroldi
 Delma nasuta
 Delma pax
 Delma tincta
 Lialis burtonis (Burton's legless lizard)
 Pletholax gracilis
 Pygopus lepidopodus (common scaly foot)
 Pygopus nigriceps (black-headed scaly foot)
 Pygopus steelescotti

Scincidae (skinks)
 Bassiana trilineata
 Carlia amax
 Carlia gracilis
 Carlia johnstonei
 Carlia munda
 Carlia rufilatus
 Carlia triacantha
 Cryptoblepharus carnabyi
 Cryptoblepharus megastic
 Cryptoblepharus plagiocephalus
 Cryptoblepharus virgatus
 Ctenotus alacer
 Ctenotus alleni
 Ctenotus angusticeps
 Ctenotus ariadnae
 Ctenotus atlas
 Ctenotus australis
 Ctenotus brooksi
 Ctenotus calurus
 Ctenotus catenifer
 Ctenotus colletti
 Ctenotus decaneurus
 Ctenotus delli
 Ctenotus dux
 Ctenotus ehmanni
 Ctenotus fallens
 Ctenotus gemmula
 Ctenotus grandis
 Ctenotus greeri
 Ctenotus hanloni
 Ctenotus helenae
 Ctenotus impar
 Ctenotus inornatus
 Ctenotus labillardieri
 Ctenotus lancelini
 Ctenotus leae
 Ctenotus leonhardii
 Ctenotus mastigura
 Ctenotus militaris
 Ctenotus mimetes
 Ctenotus nasutus
 Ctenotus ora
 Ctenotus nigrilineatus
 Ctenotus pantherinus
 Ctenotus piankai
 Ctenotus quattuordecimli
 Ctenotus robustus
 Ctenotus rubicundus
 Ctenotus rufescens
 Ctenotus rutilans
 Ctenotus saxatilis
 Ctenotus schomburgkii
 Ctenotus serventyi
 Ctenotus severus
 Ctenotus tanamiensis
 Ctenotus tantillus
 Ctenotus uber
 Ctenotus xenopleura
 Ctenotus youngsoni
 Ctenotus zastictus
 Cyclodomorphus branchial
 Cyclodomorphus maxima
 Egernia carinata
 Egernia adepressa
 Egernia douglasi
 Egernia formosa
 Egernia inornata
 Egernia kingii
 Egernia kintorei
 Egernia luctuosa
 Egernia multiscutata
 Egernia napoleonis
 Egernia pilbarensis
 Egernia pulchra
 Egernia stokesii
 Egernia striata
 Eremiascincus richardson (broad-banded sand swimmer)
 Glaphyromorphus brongers
 Glaphyromorphus darwinie
 Glaphyromorphus gracilip
 Glaphyromorphus isolepis
 Hemiergis initialis
 Hemiergis millewae
 Hemiergis peronii
 Hemiergis quadrilineatum
 Lerista allochira
 Lerista apoda
 Lerista arenicola
 Lerista axillaris
 Lerista bipes
 Lerista borealis
 Lerista bunglebungle
 Lerista chalybura
 Lerista christinae
 Lerista concolor
 Lerista connivens
 Lerista distinguenda
 Lerista dorsalis
 Lerista elegans
 Lerista flammicauda
 Lerista frosti
 Lerista gascoynensis
 Lerista gerrardii
 Lerista greeri
 Lerista griffini
 Lerista haroldi
 Lerista humphriesi
 Lerista ips
 Lerista kalumburu
 Lerista kendricki
 Lerista kennedyensis
 Lerista labialis
 Lerista lineata
 Lerista lineopunctulata
 Lerista macropisthopus
 Lerista maculosa
 Lerista microtis
 Lerista muelleri
 Lerista neander
 Lerista nichollsi
 Lerista onsloviana
 Lerista petersoni
 Lerista picturata
 Lerista planiventralis
 Lerista praefrontalis
 Lerista praepedita
 Lerista puncticauda
 Lerista quadrilineata
 Lerista robusta
 Lerista separanda
 Lerista simillima
 Lerista stictopleura
 Lerista taeniata
 Lerista talpina
 Lerista terdigitata
 Lerista tridactyla
 Lerista uniduo
 Lerista varia
 Lerista vermicularis
 Lerista viduata
 Lerista walkeri
 Lerista xanthura
 Lerista yuna
 Menetia amaura
 Menetia greyii
 Menetia maini
 Menetia surda
 Morethia adelaidensis
 Morethia boulengeri
 Morethia butleri
 Morethia lineoocellata
 Morethia obscura
 Morethia ruficauda
 Morethia storri
 Notoscincus butleri
 Notoscincus ornatus
 Proablepharus reginae
 Proablepharus tenuis
 Pseudemoia baudini
 Tiliqua multifasciata (Centralian blue-tongued lizard)
 Tiliqua occipitalis (western blue-tongued lizard)
 Tiliqua scincoides (eastern blue-tongued lizard)
 Trachydosaurus rugosus (shingle-back)

Varanidae (goannas or monitors)
 Varanus acanthurus (ridge-tailed monitor)
 Varanus brevicauda (short-tailed pygmy monitor)
 Varanus caudolineatus (line-tailed pygmy monitor)
 Varanus eremius (rusty desert monitor)
 Varanus giganteus (perentie)
 Varanus gilleni (pygmy mulga monitor)
 Varanus glauerti (Glauert's monitor)
 Varanus glebopalma (long-tailed rock monitor)
 Varanus gouldii (Gould's goanna, sand monitor)
 Varanus gouldii flavirufus (Centralian sand goanna)
 Varanus kingorum (pygmy rock monitor)
 Varanus mertensi (Mertens' water monitor)
 Varanus mitchelli (Mitchell's water monitor)
 Varanus panoptes (yellow-spotted monitor)
 Varanus pilbarensis (Pilbara rock monitor)
 Varanus rosenbergi (Rosenberg's heath monitor)
 Varanus storri (Storr's monitor)
 Varanus timorensis (Timor monitor, spotted tree monitor)
 Varanus tristis (black-headed monitor, freckled monitor)

Serpentes (snakes)
Acrochordidae (file snakes)
 Acrochordus granulatus (little file snake)

Pythonidae (pythons)
 Antaresia childreni (Children's python)
 Antaresia maculosa (spotted python)
 Antaresia perthensis (pygmy python)
 Antaresia stimsoni (large-blotched python)
 Aspidites melanocephalus (black-headed python)
 Aspidites ramsayi (woma python)
 Liasis fuscus (water python)
 Liasis olivaceus (olive python)
 L. o. barroni (western olive python)
 Morelia carinata (rough-scaled python)
 Morelia spilota (carpet python)
 M. s. imbricata (southwestern carpet python)
 M. s. variegata (northwestern carpet python)

Colubridae (Colubrids)
 Boiga irregularis (brown tree snake)
 Cerberus rhynchops (bockadam)
 Dendrelaphis punctulata (common tree snake)
 Fordonia leucobalia (white-bellied mangrove snake)
 Myron richardsonii (Richardson's mangrove snake)
 Tropidonophis mairii (keelback or freshwater snake)

Elapidae (Elapids)
 Acanthophis antarcticus (common death adder)
 Acanthophis praelongus (northern death adder)
 Acanthophis pyrrhus (desert death adder)
 Demansia atra (black whip snake)
 Demansia olivacea (marble-headed whip snake)
 Demansia papuensis (Papaun whip snake)
 Demansia psammophis (yellow-faced whip snake)
 Demansia simplex (whip snake)
 Drysdalia coronata (crowned snake)
 Drysdalia mastersii (Masters' snake)
 Echiopsis atriceps
 Echiopsis curta (bardick)
 Elapognathus minor (little brown snake)
 Furina ornata (orange-naped snake)
 Notechis scutatus (eastern tiger snake, mainland tiger snake)
 Oxyuranus scutellatus (coastal taipan)
 Oxyuranus temporalis (Central Ranges taipan)
 Pseudechis australis (king brown, mulga snake)
 Pseudechis butleri (Butler's snake)
 Pseudonaja affinis (dugite)
 Pseudonaja inframacula (peninsula brown snake)
 Pseudonaja ingrami (Ingram's brown snake)
 Pseudonaja modesta (ringed brown snake)
 Pseudonaja nuchalis (western brown snake, gwarder)
 Pseudonaja textilis (common brown snake, eastern brown snake)
 Rhinoplocephalus bicolor (Muller's snake)
 Rhinoplocephalus pallidiceps (northern small-eyed snake)
 Simoselaps anomalus (northern desert banded snake)
 Simoselaps approximans
 Simoselaps bertholdi (desert banded snake)
 Simoselaps bimaculatus (western black-naped snake)
 Simoselaps calonotus (western black-striped snake)
 Simoselaps fasciolatus (narrow-banded burrowing snake)
 Simoselaps littoralis (coastal burrowing snake)
 Simoselaps minimus
 Simoselaps semifasciatus (half-girdled snake)
 Suta fasciata (Rosen's snake)
 Suta gouldii (black-headed snake)
 Suta monachus (hooded snake)
 Suta nigriceps
 Suta ordensis (Ord curl snake)
 Suta punctata (little spotted snake)
 Suta spectabilis
 Suta suta (myall snake, curl snake)
 Vermicella annulata (bandy-bandy)
 Vermicella multifasciata (northern bandy-bandy)

Hydrophiidae (sea snakes)
 Acalyptophis peronii
 Aipysurus apraefrontalis
 Aipysurus duboisii (Dubois's sea snake)
 Aipysurus eydouxii (spine-tailed sea snake)
 Aipysurus foliosquama
 Aipysurus fuscus
 Aipysurus laevis (olive sea snake)
 Aipysurus tenuis
 Astrotia stokesii
 Disteira kingii
 Disteira major
 Disteira stokesii
 Emydocephalus annulatus
 Ephalophis greyi
 Hydrelaps darwiniensis
 Hydrophis atriceps
 Hydrophis coggeri
 Hydrophis czeblukovi
 Hydrophis elegans
 Hydrophis geometricus
 Hydrophis inornatus
 Hydrophis mcdowelli
 Hydrophis melanocephalus
 Hydrophis melanosoma
 Hydrophis ornatus
 Lapemis hardwickii
 Parahydrophis mertoni
 Pelamis platurus (yellow-bellied sea snake)

Typhlopidae (blind snakes)
 Ramphotyphlops australis
 Ramphotyphlops bitubercu
 Ramphotyphlops diversus
 Ramphotyphlops endoterus
 Ramphotyphlops grypus
 Ramphotyphlops guentheri
 Ramphotyphlops hamatus
 Ramphotyphlops howi
 Ramphotyphlops kimberley
 Ramphotyphlops leptosoma
 Ramphotyphlops ligatus
 Ramphotyphlops margareta
 Ramphotyphlops micromma
 Ramphotyphlops pinguis
 Ramphotyphlops troglodyt
 Ramphotyphlops unguirost
 Ramphotyphlops waitii
 Ramphotyphlops yampiensi

See also

References

Further reading

External links
 WA list at kingsnake.com
 WA Museum listing

Australia
Reptiles
Western Australia